Emilia Wickstead (born June 1983) is a New Zealand-born fashion designer based in London, England. In 2014 she won the Red Carpet Designer of the Year Award at the Elle Style Awards, and her clients include Samantha Cameron, and the Princess of Wales.

Early life 

Wickstead was born in June 1983, in Auckland, New Zealand to Angela Wickstead, a designer with a boutique in Parnell. At the age of 14 she and her mother moved to Milan, Italy. Wickstead studied fashion design and marketing at Central Saint Martins art school in London and interned in New York at Giorgio Armani and Vogue magazine.

Career 
At the age of 24, Wickstead's boyfriend gave her £5,000 to start her business. She created a small collection of clothes and held showings for family and friends in her living room, taking orders for made-to-measure items. Her work was featured in Tatler and UK Vogue magazines, and she was able to expand, opening a store in Belgravia, and employing a team of seamstresses. She had her first showing at London Fashion Week in 2012, and holds shows and consultations in New Zealand, New York and Milan.

Wickstead's style has been described as "graceful", "understated elegance" and her choice of colours as "pretty but not saccharine".

In May 2018, Wickstead claimed that the wedding dress of Meghan Markle was "identical" to one of her designs.

Recognition 
 Shortlisted for the BFC/Vogue Fashion Fund in 2013, 2014, 2015 and 2016
 Shortlisted for a British Fashion Award for New Establishment Designer in 2014 and 2015
 Won the Walpole Award for Brands of Tomorrow 2015
 Shortlisted for the Veuve Clicquot Business Woman Award 2015
 Won Elle magazine’s Style Award for Red Carpet Designer of the Year 2014
 BFC Fashion Trust recipient 2014.

References

1983 births
Living people
21st-century New Zealand people
People from Auckland
Alumni of Central Saint Martins
New Zealand fashion designers
New Zealand women fashion designers
New Zealand businesspeople